"Life is a Carnival" is the opening track of the Band's fourth album, Cahoots. Written by Rick Danko, Levon Helm, and Robbie Robertson, the song features horn arrangements by New Orleans musician Allen Toussaint. The song is the only track from the Cahoots album included on the original releases of Rock of Ages and The Last Waltz. The song was featured in the Bill Murray movie Larger Than Life.

Musical notation for this song is printed on a wall behind Levon Helm's grave in Woodstock, New York.

Personnel
Credits are adapted from the liner notes of A Musical History.
 Robbie Robertson – electric and acoustic guitars
 Garth Hudson – Lowrey organ
 Richard Manuel – Hohner Pianet electric piano, backing vocals
 Rick Danko – bass guitar, co-lead vocals
 Levon Helm – drums, co-lead vocals
Horn players uncredited; horn arrangements by Allen Toussaint.

Chart performance

References

The Band songs
Songs written by Robbie Robertson
1971 songs
Capitol Records singles
1971 singles
Songs written by Rick Danko
Songs written by Levon Helm